Jand Dara: The Finale or Jan Dara Patchimmabot is a 2013 Thai Drama starring Mario Maurer and Bongkot Kongmalai. This movie is a sequel to Jan Dara the Beginning which was released back in 2012. This installment came out on February 7, 2013 and was distributed by Sahamongkol Film International.

The plot is about Jan Dara sexual Awakening.

Cast
Mario Maurer as Jan Dara
Sakarat Ritthumrong as Luang Vissanun-decha (Jan Dara's Father)
Bongkot Kongmalai as Aunt Waad
Rhatha Phongam as Boonlueang
Chaiyapol Julian Pupart as Ken Krating-thong
Sho Nishino as Khun Kaew
Nutt Devahastin as Khun Ka-jon

External links
 

Thai drama films